Moses Qqu Odhiambo (born 28 October 1980), known commonly as Qqu is a Kenyan singer, songwriter, choreographer, performer, instrumentalist, lifestyle entrepreneur and digital artist.

Biography
Early life
Qqu was born to well respected Provincial Agricultural Officer and his mother who was an administrative clerk at Kenya Pipeline. Due to his father's duties, Qqu grew up with his mother. His four elder siblings were significantly older and thus were rarely around. Qqu pretty much led a secluded life. His brother first introduced him to music by playing beats on the dinner table, and it was here that Qqu delved into the world of music. Being a fast learner, Qqu would wake up hours earlier than usual just to sit at the breakfast table and wait for his brother to come to the breakfast table and learn the next rhythm....

Musical beginning
Qqu grew up listening to practically every form of music that he laid his hands on. Most notable collections he keeps to this day are Roger Whitaker, Diana Ross, Boney M, Amy Grant, Michael W. Smith, Sounds of Blackness, Rebecca Malope. While in Primary School, Qqu was notorious for banging his desk in between lessons to make music, and this gave way to him becoming the youngest instrumentalist to join the Church choir at age 8. It was here that he felt most at home, growing in his faith and playing with great musicians such as Pete Odera, Sally Oyugi, Mary Warambo, Hellen Mtawali (whom he would later on join with as teachers at first and second edition of Tusker Project Fame alongside his fellow choreographer Ian Wainaina)
Having finished High School, Qqu was part of the initial group that formed one of Kenya's most successful dance companies (Ollovar), and it was here that the seeds for music were sown. Alongside Ian Wainaina they formed the group NIX and they went on to record one of their most successful albums, Xaxawa.

Music career
Although influenced by a myriad of musical styles, Qqu favours the dancefloor, so HipHop, Salsa and Lingala are his greatest love. His musical tastes are for Conscious HipHop, Uptempo Lingala and Smooth Zouk. He is currently finishing off tracks for his Debut album, Alive. Qqu is working with artists like annieSoul, Juliani, Freestyle Essien from Nigeria, The Villagers and others. The album is set to be released in November/December 2014 and will be his first to have a worldwide release. Qqu performs in English, Swahili, Luo.

2005–2006 Xaxawa
Qqu while in NIX released this album and had great hits such as Beba (feat Ventura Rodriguez). Nakudanganya and one of East Africa's all time love ballads Sura ya Malaika.

2007 Utado
One of 2007's best club singles, also still with NIX. This song had a great twist in that both Ian and Qqu sang in their native languages (Kikuyu and Luo) and served as a unifying factor during the period before the 2008 General Elections.

2012 Hisivi
Qqu was featured on this radio hit with Wini Nkinda an accomplished Choreographer turned musician

2012 There she goes again with Chris Adwar
A Playful song that was set to be a free internet release.

Live performances
Qqu is known for his energy on stage, having been on tour with Wyre for over three years, Dance has become a hallmark for him. With his signature grin Qqu is adored by many and is a mentor to many dance groups that have since hit the scene.
Qqu has shared the stage with many artistes like P-Square, Wutah, Oliver Mtukudzi, Bebe Cool, Chameleon, Kanjii, Eric wainaina, Kevin Wyre, 2Face Idibia, TMK Wanaume, Ray C, Morgan Heritage, Jay Sean, Raghav, Mr. Vegas, Kidum, Professor Jay, AY, Nonini, Jua Cali, Amani, Wahu, Nameless, Nyota Ndogo, Redsan, Nikki, Kleptomaniax, Susan Owiyo, Hellen Mtawali, Achieng Abura, Abbas, Ukoo Fulani, Longombas, and many more.

TV appearances
Qqu appeared in 2013 Orange Beat Ya Street TV show on NTV(Kenya) as the Chief Judge and was selected because of his role in pioneering the dance industry in Kenya. The show proved to be a major gaining the necessary top spot ratings in its time slot. The Competition saw the winner collecting a cool kshs 5million. The show showed Qqu in his element directing the young and upcoming groups and giving them solid advice on how to push their careers in dance.

Humanitarian work
A serious advocate for sustainable lifestyles, Qqu is an ecovangelist and is currently setting up basic plastic recycling plants which are cost effective and environment friendly, and are managed by the locals.
He is obsessed with Hydroponics knowing fully how water is both a scarce and equally wasted resource. He hopes to find out ways to get this to the masses who might have little space to work with and challenge the notion that to produce you have to have large tracts of land. He's also the founder of the Alive campaign, which seeks above all things to encourage mentorship in primary and high schools.
He's also an advocate for NACADA and Club 254 which seek to enlighten high school students on the dangers of drugs and alcohol.
He was one of the founders of Inter prisons dance championship which is now in its fourth year with aim of giving inmates a creative outlet.

New media strategy and content development work
Having actively delved in IT at the same time as he did dance and music. Moses Qqu has been instrumental in the shaping and creating of new media space in East and Central Africa. He is a founding member of the Design Kenya Society which is a professional design institution that draws membership from students, professional and stakeholders in the design industry in Kenya. DKS is affiliated to Network of Africa Designers and by extension, International Council of Societies of Industrial Design (ICSID). He has been instrumental in the shaping of Design Kenya Society and mobilization and recruitment of designers. He is also currently serving in the steering committee of the Art Directors and Copywriters Club of Kenya. Moses Qqu is also one of the key resource persons in the review and development of undergraduate, Diploma and Certificate programmes at the School of The Arts and Design at the University of Nairobi. His currently portfolio extends through the creme de la creme in corporate working on projects for clients such as Samsung, Orange Telecom, Alcatel, Safaricom, Coca-Cola, Barclays Bank and many more.

Discography

Albums
 Xaxawa (NIX) (2005)
 Utado (NIX) (2007)
 Sonko (NIX) (2009)
 Alive (2011)

Singles
 "Kua Hivyo" (2005)
 "Beba" (2005)
 "Kixawa" (2005)
 "Nakudanganya" (2006)
 "Sura ya Malaika" (2006)
 "Utado" (2007)
 "Beat ya Mkamba" (2008)
 "Sonko" (2008)
 "Alive" (2014)

Producer credits
 Chris Adwar – Xaxawa (2005)
 Clement "Razul" Mutua – Whoa (2005)
 Paul "Ulopa Ngoma" Kibukosya – Oku Gatia (2007)
 The Big Boss – Alive (2010)

Awards
Won
 Best Professional Web Designer of the year Cybermatrixx Awards 2005–2007
 Best HipHop Dance Group at the Sprite Ball Face Off 2006 (DF1)

Nominated
 Nominated for best HipHop Group at the Kisima Awards 2006
 Nominated for best Bomba Male at the Kisima Awards 2007
 Nominated for best Group Kenya at the Kisima Awards 2007
 Nominated for best East African Artist at the Africa Gospel Music Awards 2011

References
 
 
 http://entertainment.ke.msn.com/local-news/qqu-is-back-after-paralysis
 https://web.archive.org/web/20100203130954/http://museke.com/en/aggregator/categories/2?page=5 Review: Museke.com
 
 http://www.orange-tkl.co.ke/index.php?option=com_content&view=article&id=326:orange-launches-second-leg-of-street-dance-competition-&catid=1:latest-news&Itemid=28
 http://getmziki.com/beta/2010/02/03/qqu-feat-tuzo-alive-getmziki-exclusive Review : Getmziki.com
 http://hotsecretz.blogspot.com/2009/07/malta-guinness-unveils-street-dance.html Hot Secrets
 https://web.archive.org/web/20090821140024/http://www.capitalfm.co.ke/lifestyle/entertainment_news/local_e-news/3089-Profiles-the-Judges-the-Malta-Guinness-Street-Dance-Competition.html Capital Fm – Kenya's leading Radio Stations
 http://www.standardmedia.co.ke/mag/InsidePage.php?id=1144020895&cid=123& Interview on Standard Newspaper
 https://web.archive.org/web/20090711201253/http://www.haiya.co.ke/node/6816 Entertainment Blog – Haiya
 https://web.archive.org/web/20110723135021/http://globalessence.net/index.php?id=6&tx_ttnews%5Bpointer%5D=7&tx_ttnews%5Btt_news%5D=344&tx_ttnews%5BbackPid%5D=12&cHash=9024fa9837 Entertainment Blog – Global Essence
 http://hi-in.facebook.com/group.php?gid=101001353642 Facebook group
 https://web.archive.org/web/20110722132248/http://www.kisimaawards.co.ke/kminner.asp?cat=nom07&pcat=nominees&sid=&pags=26925 Kisima Awards Nomination
 https://web.archive.org/web/20110717093516/http://www.africagospelawards.com/nominees

External links
 Qqu (Official website)
 Qqu (Twitter)
 Qqu (Facebook Page)
 Qqu (Lyric website)

Living people
1980 births
Musicians from Nairobi